Itajahya hornseyi is a species of fungus in the family Phallaceae. Found in Australia, it was described as new to science in 1954 by British mycologist Clifford Gerald Hansford.

References

External links

Phallales
Fungi described in 1955
Fungi of Australia